The Convention on the Exercise of Liberal Professions of 1939 is a treaty signed in the Second South American Congress of Private International Law of 1939 and 1940 in Montevideo, by which allows holders of an academic degree obtained in a public education institution of a state party to validate their degrees in another state party provided that the degree keeps a reasonable equivalence with the corresponding one in the second state. This treaty updates the provisions of the Convention on the Exercise of Liberal Professions of 1889, and binds Argentina, Paraguay and Uruguay.

Parties

References 

Conflict of laws
1939 treaties
Treaties of Argentina
Treaties of Paraguay
Treaties of Uruguay